Mary Brown (1929 – 20 December 1999) was a British author of science fiction and fantasy stories, including The Unlikely Ones.

Published books

Pigs Don't Fly
 The Unlikely Ones (1986)
 Pigs Don't Fly (1994)
 Master of Many Treasures (1995)
 Dragonne's Eg (1999)
Omnibus eds.: The Unexpected Dragon (1999, #2-4); Here There Be Dragonnes (2003, #1-3)

Other
 Mr. Sin (1970), 
 Playing the Jack (1984) – set in 1785, 
 The Heart Has Its Reasons (1992) – sequel to Playing the Jack? 
 Strange Deliverance (1997)

References

Citations

External links 

 
  (mainly under 'Brown, Mary, 1929–' without '1999', previous page of browse report)

1929 births
1999 deaths
Women science fiction and fantasy writers
British science fiction writers